Setonji 'Set' Osho (born 28 September 1986) is a sprinter from the United Kingdom. He won 4X400 m gold medal as part of the European junior 4X400 m Great Britain team, which also included Martyn Rooney, Richard Buck, and Richard Strachan in 2005 .
He is a current Sussex junior 400 m record holder, breaking Olympic champion Steve Ovett mark to set the current record. A record which stood for 25 years previously. 
In 2009, Set claimed the Bronze medal at the Aviva AAA National World Trials.

Background 

Set was born in Nigeria, one of 4 boys born to Linda and Emanuel Osho. Neither, of his parents were particularly athletic however his mother did compete in athletics for her school with high jump being her favourite event. Set lived in Nigeria until he was 6, when his parents relocated to the UK seeking a better quality of life for his younger brother Deji, who had been born with a Down syndrome. Set grew up in Brighton (UK)
He attended St Mary Magdalen Primary School, and later, Cardinal Newman Catholic School where he played football, rugby, and athletic for the school. His favourite events being the sprint and jumps. Spotting Set's athletic potential, after inter school sports day, a local teacher took Set down to the local athletic's club Brighton & Hove AC at Withdean Stadium. Set competed for Brighton for many years before being scouted to join the London club Belgrave Harriers.

European Junior Championships 4 x 400 m relay (2005)

External links
Set Osho Official Website

1986 births
Living people
British male sprinters